Viviparus teschi is an extinct species of freshwater snail with an operculum, an aquatic gastropod mollusk in the family Viviparidae, the river snails.

The specific name is in honor of Dutch geologist Pieter Tesch (1879-1961).

Distribution 
Type locality is in province Gelderland in the Netherlands.

References

Viviparidae
Pleistocene gastropods